The RFNS Volasiga is an oceanic survey vessel operated by the Republic of Fiji Navy.  She was donated by the Republic of Korea in 2019.  She has a crew of 15.

Fiji and the Korean Hydrographic Oceanography Agency (KHOA) cooperate over the vessel's science program.

References

Survey ships
Ships of the Fijian Navy